National Organization of Russian Scouts may refer to

 National Organization of Russian Scouts (Russia), a Russian Scouting organization
 National Organization of Russian Scouts (Scouts-in-Exile), a Scouts-in-Exile organization